Anthony Stuart Cole  (born 17 March 1947) is a retired senior Australian public servant. He served the Commonwealth in various capacities for over 25 years.

Early life
Cole was born in Macksville, New South Wales, on 17 March 1947. He attended Macksville High School.

Career
In 1968, Cole graduated with a Bachelor of Economics degree from the University of Sydney and joined the Department of the Treasury.

From 1979 Cole spent two years as a senior World Bank official, saying these years were crucial in developing his views on economic policy. Shortly after in 1983 Cole was appointed principal private secretary to Treasurer Paul Keating, working in the role until October 1985.

He was appointed the thirteenth Secretary of the Department of the Treasury in 1991, remaining in the role until 1993 when he transferred to another role as Secretary of the Department of Health, Housing, Local Government and Community Services (later Department of Human Services and Health). There was speculation at the time that Cole was removed as Treasury Secretary due to evidence he gave to a Senate inquiry into Victoria's debt blowout, the Treasurer, John Dawkins, denied the suggestion, stating that his move was just a normal part of the re-establishment of administration following an election.

Cole left the public service in 1994, aged 47. When he left, John Taylor, the Commonwealth Auditor-General at the time, told media "it's a tragedy that somebody of the standing and even future potential of Tony Cole should be lost to public service".

After leaving the public sector, Cole was a Senior Investment Consultant and Executive in the Commonwealth Superannuation Corporation’s investment consulting business for 17 years, including heading the business in the Asia Pacific region for more than five years.

In 2013 and 2014, he was a member of the Abbott Government's National Commission of Audit, which was established to improve the Australian government's budget.

Awards
In 1995, Cole was honoured as an Officer of the Order of Australia, in recognition of service to the development of public sector policy.

References

Living people
1947 births
Officers of the Order of Australia
Secretaries of the Department of the Treasury of Australia
Secretaries of the Australian Government Health Department